Julio César "Coyote" Rivera González (born 12 April 1967) is a retired Peruvian footballer who played mainly as a winger.

Club career
Julio Rivera developed as a footballer in the Alianza Lima youth system. He then started his senior career with Segunda División side Escuela Técnica del Ejército (ETE). Later he joined Juvenil Los Ángeles and played there with his brother Óscar Rivera. There Julio made his debut in the Torneo Descentralizado and played for the Moquegua club until the end of the 1991 season.

He would then have his chance to play for Arequipa giants FBC Melgar in the 1992 Torneo Descentralizado season.

After an impressive season with Melgar, Rivero joined Sporting Cristal in January 1993.

Personal life
He is a half-brother of Paolo Guerrero, current national team's captain.

His son, also named Julio Rivera, was murdered during a robbery in Lima.

Honours

Club
Sporting Cristal
 Apertura: 1994
Torneo Descentralizado (3): 1994, 1995, 1996

Universitario de Deportes 
 Torneo Descentralizado (1): 2000

References

1967 births
Living people
Footballers from Lima
Peruvian footballers
Peru international footballers
FBC Melgar footballers
Sporting Cristal footballers
Club Universitario de Deportes footballers
Sport Boys footballers
Peruvian Primera División players
1993 Copa América players
1995 Copa América players
Association football wingers
Association football fullbacks
Association football utility players